TATA element modulatory factor is a protein that in humans is encoded by the TMF1 gene.

Interactions
TMF1 has been shown to interact with FER and Androgen receptor.

References

Further reading